The blue-faced rail (Gymnocrex rosenbergii) or bald-faced rail, is a species of bird in the family Rallidae. It is endemic to northern Sulawesi, Indonesia.

Its natural habitats are subtropical or tropical moist lowland forest, subtropical or tropical moist shrubland, and rivers.

It has been evaluated as a threatened species since October 1, 2016, by the IUCN Red List due to habitat loss and pollution .

By 2000, the estimated population of the blue-faced rail is around 2500-9999.

Description 

The blue-faced rail is a 30 cm, medium-sized, secretive, forest rail. It has a conspicuous patch of bare cobalt-blue skin around the eye, that gives the bird its distinctive name. The blue-faced rail makes a snoring sound apparently similar to that of the snoring rail, and it may also give off a quiet clucking sound in alarm.

References

External links
 Blue-faced Rail on the BirdLife Species Factsheet.

blue-faced rail
Endemic birds of Sulawesi
blue-faced rail
Taxonomy articles created by Polbot